This page is a complete chronological listing of VFL/AFL premiers. The Australian Football League (AFL), known as the Victorian Football League (VFL) until 1990, is the elite national competition in men's Australian rules football.

The inaugural premiership was awarded as a result of a round-robin finals system; this format was replaced after the first season, and a grand final has been held every season since 1898 to determine the premiers, with the exception of 1924 when a modified round-robin system was used. The formation of a national competition, beginning in 1987, has resulted in the league attempting to develop "an even and stable competition" through a range of equalisation policies, such as a salary cap and draft (introduced in 1985 and 1986 respectively). This has had a significant impact on the spread of premierships: since 1990, thirteen clubs have won a premiership, compared with only five clubs between 1967 and 1989.

List of premiers

Premierships by club

Minor grade premierships 
In addition to the seniors, VFL/AFL clubs have competed in premierships in three minor grades:
 VFL/AFL Seconds/Reserves premierships: 1919–1999
 VFL/AFL Thirds/Under-19s premierships: 1946–1991
 VFL/AFL Night premierships: 1956–1971, 1977–2013

VFL/AFL Seconds/Reserves premierships 
The reserve grade premiership was held in various formats between 1919 and 1999. It was known as the Victorian Junior Football League from 1919 until 1923, the Seconds from 1924 until 1959, the VFL Reserves from 1960 until 1989, and as the AFL reserves from 1990 until 1999. Until 1991, the competition was run by the VFL/AFL, and from 1992 until 1999 it was administered by the Victorian State Football League.

1919 Collingwood (1)
1920 Collingwood (2)
1921 Essendon (1)
1922 Collingwood (3)
1923 Geelong (1)
1924 Geelong ((2)
1925 Collingwood (4)
1926 Carlton (1)
1927 Carlton (2)
1928 Carlton (3)
1929 Richmond (1)
1930 Geelong ((3)
1931 Melbourne (1)
1932 Melbourne (2)
1933 Melbourne (3)
1934 Melbourne (4)
1935 Melbourne (5)
1936 Footscray (1)
1937 Geelong (4)
1938 Geelong (5)
1939 Melbourne (6)
1940 Collingwood (5)
1941 Essendon (2)
1942 St Kilda (1)
1943 St Kilda (2)
1944 Fitzroy (1)
1945 Footscray (2)
1946 Richmond (2)
1947 North Melbourne (1)
1948 Geelong (6)
1949 Melbourne (7)
1950 Essendon (3)
1951 Carlton (4)
1952 Essendon  (4)
1953 Carlton (5)
1954 Richmond (3)
1955 Richmond (4)
1956 Melbourne (8)
1957 North Melbourne (2)
1958 Hawthorn (1)
1959 Hawthorn (2)
1960 Geelong (7)
1961 St Kilda (3)
1962 Footscray (3)
1963 Geelong (8)
1964 Geelong (9)
1965 Collingwood (6)
1966 Richmond (5)
1967 North Melbourne (3)
1968 Essendon (5)
1969 Melbourne (9)
1970 Melbourne (10)
1971 Richmond (6)
1972 Hawthorn (3)
1973 Hawthorn (7)
1974 Fitzroy (2)
1975 Geelong (10)
1976 Collingwood (7)
1977 Richmond (8)
1978 North Melbourne (4)
1979 North Melbourne (5)
1980 Geelong (11)
1981 Geelong (12)
1982 Geelong (13)
1983 Essendon (6)
1984 Melbourne (11)
1985 Hawthorn (4)
1986 Carlton (6)
1987 Carlton (7)
1988 Footscray (4)
1989 Fitzroy (3)
1990 Carlton (8)
1991 Brisbane (1)
1992 Essendon (7)
1993 Melbourne (12)
1994 Footscray (5)
1995 North Melbourne (6)
1996 North Melbourne (7)
1997 Richmond (9)
1998 Western Bulldogs (6)
1999 Essendon (8)
Source where unlisted

VFL/AFL Thirds/Under-19s premierships 
The VFL/AFL's Under-19s competition was held between 1946 and 1991. It was known as the VFL Thirds from 1946 until 1959, and as the Under-19s from 1960 until 1991.

1946 North Melbourne (1)
1947 Melbourne (1)
1948 Carlton (1)
1949 Carlton (2)
1950 Essendon (1)
1951 Carlton (3)
1952 Essendon (2)
1953 Melbourne (2)
1954 Footscray (1)
1955 Fitzroy (1)
1956 South Melbourne (1)
1957 St Kilda (1)
1958 Richmond (1)
1959 Essendon (3)
1960 Collingwood (1)
1961 Essendon (4)
1962 Geelong (1)
1963 Carlton (4)
1964 Melbourne (3)
1965 Collingwood (2)
1966 Essendon (5)
1967 Richmond (2)
1968 Richmond (3)
1969 Richmond (4)
1970 Richmond (5)
1971 Melbourne (4)
1972 Hawthorn (1)
1973 Richmond (6)
1974 Collingwood (3)
1975 Richmond (7)
1976 North Melbourne (2)
1977 Richmond (8)
1978 Carlton (5)
1979 Carlton (6)
1980 Richmond (9)
1981 Melbourne (5)
1982 Fitzroy (2)
1983 Melbourne (6)
1984 North Melbourne (3)
1985 Richmond (10)
1986 Collingwood (4)
1987 North Melbourne (4)
1988 North Melbourne (5)
1989 Richmond (11)
1990 North Melbourne (6)
1991 North Melbourne (7)
Source

VFL/AFL Night premierships 
The pre-season and night premiership covers three competitions which are considered historically equivalent in status:
VFL Night Series, a consolation competition played amongst non-finalists between 1956 and 1971.
Australian Football Championships Night Series, a mid-season knock-out competition played concurrently with the premiership and involving teams from interstate, played between 1977 and 1987.
Australian Football League pre-season competition, played before each season from 1988 until 2013.

For a list of premiers in these competitions, see list of VFL/AFL pre-season and night series premiers.

See also 
 AFL Grand Final
 List of AFL Women's premiers
 List of VFL/AFL pre-season and night series premiers
 List of VFL/AFL premiership captains and coaches
 List of VFL/AFL wooden spoons
 VFL/AFL premiership and grand final statistics

Notes

  In these cases, had the other team won the match, a rematch would have been played the following weekend.
   was known as South Melbourne prior to relocation in 1982.
   was known simply as the Kangaroos from 1999 to 2007.
   was known as Footscray prior to 1997.

References

Sources 
 Australian Football League
 Full Points Footy
 AFL Tables

Australian Football League
Premiers
Australian Football League premiers